The Oriental Mindoro National High School (OMNHS) is the flagship campus and the largest public high school in Oriental Mindoro. It was established in 1921 and is located in San Vicente East, Calapan. It offers high school education from first year to fourth year. The school is headed by Dr. Nimrod Bantigue. It was formerly named Oriental Mindoro High School and Jose J. Leido, Jr. Memorial National High School.

Population
OMNHS, or Lemnahis as it is affectionately called, caters to a total of 5,264 students comprising 1,502 freshmen, 1,358 sophomores, 1,246 juniors and 1,258 seniors. Its faculty comprises 185 teaching staff and 33 non-teaching personnel within 119 classrooms on  enclosed fields.

Educational system
Oriental Mindoro National High School is known for its exemplary performance in the fields of academics. It is one of the southern Tagalog region's leading institutions of secondary learning specializing in mathematics, science and technology, English and Filipino subjects. Its students are known to be some of the toughest in Region IV. OMNHS is also famous for its good physical education instructors, and the school's  athletes have joined and won competitions all over the Philippines and abroad.

Year sections are divided between the Special Science Classes (SSC, also known as the Star Sections) which is composed primarily of academically excellent and intelligent students, and the Regular Sections, which comprise the majority of the students.

Special Science Classes is OMNHS' version of the Philippine Science High School's education system due to the absence of the latter's branch in Mindoro. It adopts and conforms with PSHS's standards, and the Department of Science and Technology has its own building and laboratories inside the campus. Special Science classes generally take two to three additional subjects such as Advanced Journalism, Elective Science, or a course in Research in addition to the normal subjects normally taken by ordinary average students in lower sections. Honor students are also selected from the Special Science classes.

As of a 2008 Faculty and Students interview, there are seven SSC sections for freshmen and sophomores, five for juniors and four for seniors.

Events
On 2004, Neil Everett B. Elpusan was awarded one of the Ten Outstanding Boy Scouts of the Philippines.

In February 2005, a team placed first in the Physical Science Division for Cluster 2, team category of the 2004-2005 Intel Philippines Science Fair (National Finals).

On February 7, 2008, the Mangyan Cultural Festival was launched in the school through the initiative of the Provincial Tourism Office of Oriental Mindoro in cooperation of the National Commission for Culture and the Arts. The festival celebrates the richness and diversity of the Mangyan cultures through exhibits, theater, dance, and musical performances by the Mangyans themselves, who are known to be the original inhabitants of the province of Mindoro.

On February 4–6, 2009, Jose J. Leido Jr. Memorial National High School hosted the 6th National Science Quest, the first time the school hosted a national competition. The competition was sponsored by the Association of Science Educators of the Philippines.

On March 20, 2009, Ron Michael L. Castillo was adjudged as one of the Ten Outstanding Public School Students of the Philippines.

On November 9–14, 2009, Nigel Jeronimo C. Santos won second place in the National Extemporaneous Speech Competition at the KAPNAYAN 2009, a chemistry fair held every three years.

On January 29, 2011, a team reached third place in the University of the Philippines Diliman Stat Challenge XIII.

On July 23, 2012, the Republic Act 10472 was passed, restoring the name of Jose J. Leido, Jr. Memorial National High School to Oriental Mindoro National High School.

Departments
English - Ma. Celeste Z. Abadejos
Mathematics - Rebecca S. Arellano
Science - Elmo B. Enriquez
Filipino - Roberto A. Gabia
Social Studies - Merlie DJ. Mauhay
Technology and Livelihood Education (TLE) - Jowe Leonilo M. Bautista
Music, Arts, Physical Education, and Health - Joselito E. Lumanglas
Values Education - Ruby D. Guevarra
Science, Technology, Engineering (STE) Program - Maria Bella F. Castillo
Special Program in Journalism - Antonio A. Alido
Special Program in Arts - Antonio A. Caibigan, Jr.
Senior High School, Arts & Design Track - Roderick Jose A. Calivara

Notable students and graduates

 Nestor Vicente Madali Gonzales - internationally acclaimed writer and educator
 Karen Reyes - first runner up in Pinoy Big Brother: Teen Edition 4

References

High schools in the Philippines
Schools in Calapan